Viktor Yevgenyevich Sebelev (born 11 March 1972) is a Russian football manager and a former player.

Club career
He played 10 seasons in the Russian Football National League for FC Tom Tomsk and FC Chkalovets-1936 Novosibirsk.

References

1972 births
Living people
Soviet footballers
Russian footballers
Association football midfielders
Association football forwards
FC Tom Tomsk players
FC Sodovik Sterlitamak players
FC Sibir Novosibirsk players
Russian football managers
FC Tom Tomsk managers
FC Spartak Nizhny Novgorod players